The 1891 Buckingham by-election was held on 28 May 1891 after the expulsion of the incumbent Liberal MP, Edmund Verney, who had won in a by-election two years previously.  The seat was retained by the Liberal candidate Herbert Samuel Leon.The Conservative candidate, Evelyn Hubbard was the younger brother of a previous MP and had stood in the 1889 by-election.

References

By-elections to the Parliament of the United Kingdom in Buckinghamshire constituencies
Buckingham
May 1891 events
1891 elections in the United Kingdom
1891 in England
19th century in Buckinghamshire